Trioceros ituriensis, the Ituri forest chameleon, is a species of chameleon found in Democratic Republic of the Congo and Kenya.

References

Trioceros
Reptiles described in 1919
Taxa named by Karl Patterson Schmidt
Reptiles of the Democratic Republic of the Congo
Reptiles of Kenya